NRG Recording Studios is a recording facility located in North Hollywood, California, that was created by producer and mixer Jay Baumgardner in 1992.

Facilities 

The facility consists of three studio consoles:
Studio A console: custom vintage Neve 8068 built by Pat Schneider
Studio B console: custom vintage Neve 8078
Studio C console: SSL 9000J

SAN at NRG 

Chief Engineer Wade Norton and Owner Jay Baumgardner worked with Paul Levy of Advanced Audio Rentals to incorporate a Fibre Channel storage area network (SAN) into their facility. This allowed for reduced noise inside of the control rooms and provided tighter security to clients by automatically backing up sessions into a secured central location.

Albums recorded
 Cracked Rear View – Hootie & the Blowfish (1994)
 Transistor – 311 (1997)
 Follow the Leader – Korn (1998)
 Significant Other – Limp Bizkit (1999)
 Infest  - Papa Roach (2000)
 Hybrid Theory – Linkin Park (2000)
 Conspiracy of One – The Offspring (2000)
 Break the Cycle – Staind (2001)
 Fallen – Evanescence (2003)
 Meteora – Linkin Park (2003)
 Contraband – Velvet Revolver (2004)
 Minutes to Midnight – Linkin Park (2007)
  A Thousand Suns - Linkin Park (2010)
 Living Things – Linkin Park (2012)

Artists who have worked at NRG Recording 

 Hed PE
 12 Stones
 311
 Adema
 Alicia Keys
 Alien Ant Farm
 Anberlin
 Atomship
 Avril Lavigne
 Badflower
 Beck
 Bon Jovi
 Boysetsfire
 Bralalalala
 Buckcherry
 Bush
 B'z
 Chris Cornell
 Coal Chamber
 Common
 Dance Hall Crashers
 Dashboard Confessional
 Dave Navarro
 Deadsy
 Dido
 Die Trying
 Died Pretty
 DJ Z-Trip
 Drowning Pool
 Endwell
 Escape The Fate
 Evanescence
 Eve 6
 Everlast
 Fear Factory
 Finger Eleven
 Fiona Apple
 Foo Fighters
 Fort Minor
 Full Scale
 Girl On Fire 
 Godsmack
 Good Charlotte
 Helmet 
 Hollywood Undead 
 Hoobastank
 Hootie & the Blowfish
 Hot Hot Heat
 HIM
 Ice Cube
 Ima Robot
 Incubus
 Jay-Z
 John Fogerty
 Jurassic 5
 Kanye West
 KAT-TUN
 Kelly Clarkson
 Korn
 Limp Bizkit
 Linkin Park
 LostAlone
 Lostprophets
 Lit
 Mae
 Matchbox Twenty
 Melissa Etheridge
 Michael Franti & Spearhead
 Michelle Branch
 Montecristo
 Monterey Pop Festival
 Motörhead
 Nas
 New Found Glory
 No Doubt
 Oliver Tree
 Ontronik
 Orgy
 P.O.D.
 Papa Roach
 Poe
 Powerspace
 Puddle of Mudd
 Revis
 Robin Thicke
 Rooney
 Sara Bareilles
 Save Ferris
 Scary Kids Scaring Kids
 Seether
 Silverstein
 Slayer
 Staind
 Static-X
 Stereomud
 Stone Temple Pilots
 Strata
 Sugar Ray
 The 88
 The Iron Maidens
 The Monkees
 The Offspring
 The Panic Channel
 Thomas Dolby
 Three Days Grace
 Tom Petty
 Tonight Alive
 Toots & the Maytals
 Tracy Chapman
 Trik Turner
 Trust Company
 Velvet Revolver
 White Zombie
 Yellowjackets
 You Me At Six

External links

References 

Recording studios in California
North Hollywood, Los Angeles